Haji Suleiman Haji Ali Mnoga (born 16 April 2002) is a professional footballer who plays as a right-back or centre back for Aldershot Town on loan from Portsmouth. Born in England, he plays for the Tanzania national team.

Personal life

Haji Mnoga was born in Portsmouth to a Tanzanian father and English mother. Mnoga attended Cottage Grove Primary School and Trafalgar School. His father also played football and represented Zanzibar under 17's.

Club career

Portsmouth
Mnoga progressed through Portsmouth's youth categories. He has been at the club since 2008. He was offered a two-year scholarship contract on 28 June 2018.

Mnoga made his professional debut on 9 October 2018, starting in a 1–0 EFL Trophy away win against Crawley Town. At the age of 16 years, five months and 24 days, he became the second-youngest player to debut for the club in their post-war history, only behind fellow Academy teammate Joe Hancott.

On 21 March 2020 Mnoga was tested positive for COVID-19.

Having recovered from COVID-19, Mnoga featured for Gosport Borough in a 1-0 pre-season victory over local rivals Havant & Waterlooville at Privett Park in September 2020, having been loaned for the evening by Pompey to their neighbours across the harbour.

On 3 November 2020, Mnoga made his league debut for Portsmouth, coming off the bench to play right-wing in a 3-1 win at Lincoln City. He made his full league debut in a 4-1 home win over Crewe Alexandra, coming off at half-time. He scored his first goal for Portsmouth in an EFL Trophy tie against Cheltenham Town on 8 December 2020.

On 31 August 2021, Mnoga signed a new three-year contract with Portsmouth before moving on loan to National League side Bromley until January 2022.

On 8 January 2022, Mnoga joined National League side Weymouth on loan for the remainder of the 2021–22 season. He joined Gillingham on a season-long loan on deadline day in the summer of 2022, where he was sent off after 10 minutes of his debut. In January 2023, he joined Aldershot Town on loan until the end of the season.

International career
Mnoga was eligible to represent both England and Tanzania at international level. Mnoga made his England U17 debut on 10 February 2019, coming on at half-time against Hungary U17 in a 4-1 penalty friendly win. He debuted with Tanzania national team in a 3–1 friendly win over Central African Republic on 24 March 2022. Mnoga reportedly rejected a call up to the Tanzania Under-23 side in September 2022 to focus on his duties at Gillingham.

Career statistics

Honours

Portsmouth
 EFL Trophy: 2018-19

References

External links
Portsmouth FC profile 

2002 births
Living people
Footballers from Portsmouth
Tanzanian footballers
Tanzania international footballers
English footballers
England youth international footballers
Tanzanian people of English descent
English people of Tanzanian descent
Association football defenders
Portsmouth F.C. players
Bognor Regis Town F.C. players
Bromley F.C. players
Weymouth F.C. players
Gillingham F.C. players
Aldershot Town F.C. players
Isthmian League players
National League (English football) players
English Football League players